Forestry Innovation Investment Ltd. (FII) is a provincial government publicly owned, funded and operated company of the province of British Columbia, Canada.

It was set up by the government to promote BC wood products, educate on provincial forest practices, and provide research around sustainable forest management, life cycle analysis and the benefits of using wood products.

Programs
Market Development
Market Outreach
Business Innovation
Market Development in China through FII Shanghai

FII Shanghai
FII operates a wholly owned subsidiary in Shanghai for market development projects in China. FII Shanghai is responsible for building demonstration projects designed to showcase BC wood as a construction medium.  FII has also built two demonstration homes in Mongolia.

Governance
FII is governed by a Board of Directors that is accountable to the B.C. Minister of Jobs, Tourism and Innovation. The Minister provides direction to the Board through the issuing of a Shareholder's Letter of Expectations. The Board is responsible for appointing the Chief Executive Officer and for overseeing FII's policies, priorities and strategies.

FII operates out of offices in Vancouver, Shanghai and Beijing.

References

Forestry Innovation Investment Website: Learn more about FII and the forest economy on this site, or link to information about B.C. forest products and companies, building green with wood, and B.C.'s sustainable forest practices.
Legislative Assembly of British Columbia Committee Review
Crown Agencies Resource Office
Forestry Innovation Investment Stakeholder Report 2010
Shareholder's Letter of Expectations

External links
NaturallyWood: an online resource with an extensive range of materials to promote British Columbia forest products and sustainable forest practices 
Ministry of Jobs, Tourism and Innovation

Crown corporations of British Columbia